One for the Ghost is the ninth studio album by English musician Pete Astor. It was released on 16 February 2018, under Tapete Records.

Critical reception
One for the Ghost was met with "generally favorable" reviews from critics. At Metacritic, which assigns a weighted average rating out of 100 to reviews from mainstream publications, this release received an average score of 72, based on 8 reviews. Aggregator Album of the Year gave the release a 77 out of 100 based on a critical consensus of 3 reviews.

Track listing

Personnel

Musicians
 Pete Astor – lead vocalist
 Pam Berry – backing vocals
 Franic Rozycki – bass
 Jonny Helm – drums
 James Hoare – guitar

Production
 Giles Barrett – engineer
 Simon Trought – engineer

References

2018 albums
Tapete Records albums